Pueblo Nuevo is a town and municipality located in the Córdoba Department, northern Colombia.

References
 Official Website, Pueblo Nuevo, Cordoba
 Official Youtube Channel, Pueblo Nuevo, Cordoba

Municipalities of Córdoba Department